Pink Man (real name Michael Maxfield) is a local celebrity from the San Francisco Bay Area. He can be seen riding his unicycle around the cities of Berkeley, Oakland and San Francisco. He gets his name from the shocking pink unitard and cape he wears while he performs impromptu unicycle tricks in public places—spinning, engaging in sudden stops, riding down the street at high speeds, and carrying people on his back.

Maxfield was born and grew up in Leominster, Massachusetts, where he discovered the unicycle at age 13. He moved to San Francisco at age 19, and then to Oregon. While in Oregon, he started performing on his unicycle under the name Jester Max. When he moved back to Leominster years later, he found himself spending hours dancing on his unicycle, and pedalling around town, garnering a front page story in the Worcester Telegram. He moved back to Oregon, where he sought out a new unicycle persona; on a whim, he purchased a pink Lycra unitard costume from a dancewear catalog. The new outfit proved extremely popular, and an onlooker at the University of Oregon campus dubbed him "pink man."

Pink Man has performed in Oregon, Los Angeles, Houston, the San Francisco Bay Area, New Jersey, New York, the Pacific Northwest, Jacksonville, Vancouver, Paris, Tokyo, and Germany. His Tokyo and Paris trips were sponsored by computer-game designer Will Wright, who calls Pink Man "the only real superhero I know.".

Media

In 2002, Pink Man performed on his unicycle in a play titled "I Wheel, the Pink Man Show" which ran at the Live Oak Theater in Berkeley, California. In 2005, he appeared in the documentary film Following Sean. In May 2009, he was seen on his unicycle amusing passers-by on the streets of central London.

In 2006, Pink Man was the subject of an article in local alt weekly Folio Weekly titled "Pinky and the Brain." In it, Maxfield discusses events that led him to lead a nomadic lifestyle, including accusations of molestation and the subsequent dissolution of his marriage.

, there is a documentary film about Pink Man in production.

In 2012, Pink Man was also mentioned briefly in a short video by Lev Yilmaz entitled "Coffee Shop Customers" which appears as part of his YouTube series "Tales Of Mere Existence." Pink Man also makes a brief appearance in the 2012 film The Sessions, set in Berkeley..

References

External links
Archive of Pink Man's former official website
Pink Man media clippings file, from former website
SFist interview with Michael Maxfield
 Gritty in Pink by Ashley Harrell SF Weekly Wednesday, 28 January 2009:

1961 births
Living people
People from Leominster, Massachusetts
Unicyclists
American performance artists
Artists from Massachusetts
American street performers